850 Altona (prov. designation:  or ) is a large background asteroid, approximately  in diameter, that is located in the outer region of the asteroid belt. It was discovered on 27 March 1916, by Russian astronomer Sergey Belyavsky at the Simeiz Observatory on the Crimean peninsula. The X-type asteroid has a rotation period of 11.2 hours. It was named after the city of Altona near Hamburg, Germany.

Orbit and classification 

Altona is a non-family asteroid of the main belt's background population when applying the hierarchical clustering method to its proper orbital elements. It orbits the Sun in the outer asteroid belt at a distance of 2.6–3.4 AU once every 5 years and 2 months (1,897 days; semi-major axis of 3 AU). Its orbit has an eccentricity of 0.13 and an inclination of 16° with respect to the ecliptic. The body's observation arc begins at Algiers Observatory in North Africa on 28 July 1917, more than a year after its official its discovery observation at the Simeiz Observatory on 27 March 1916.

Naming 

This minor planet was named after Altona, Hamburg, the location of the Altona Observatory, at which Heinrich Christian Schumacher began publication of the astronomical journal Astronomische Nachrichten in 1821. Altona is the home-town of Friedrich Georg Wilhelm von Struve, who founded the Pulkovo Observatory near St Petersburg, Russia. The  was also mentioned in The Names of the Minor Planets by Paul Herget in 1955.

Physical characteristics 

In both the Tholen- and SMASS-like taxonomy of the Small Solar System Objects Spectroscopic Survey (S3OS2), Altona is an X-type asteroid.

Rotation period 

In September 2017, a rotational lightcurve of Altona was obtained from photometric observations by Brian Warner at his Palmer Divide Station  of the Center for Solar System Studies in California. Lightcurve analysis gave a well-defined rotation period of  hours with a brightness variation of  magnitude.

The result supersedes previous period determinations of:  and  hours by astronomers at the Palomar Transient Factory, California, in January 2014,  hours by Michael Alkema at the Elephant Head Observatory  in Arizona in December 2012,  hours by Frederick Pilcher at the Organ Mesa Observatory  in June 2010, and  hours by Robin Esseiva, Nicolas Esseiva and Raoul Behrend in April 2015.

Diameter and albedo 

The Collaborative Asteroid Lightcurve Link derives an albedo of 0.0356 and a diameter of 80.85 kilometers based on an absolute magnitude of 9.7. These timed observations are taken when the asteroid passes in front of a distant star.

Notes

References

External links 
 Lightcurve Database Query (LCDB), at www.minorplanet.info
 Dictionary of Minor Planet Names, Google books
 Asteroids and comets rotation curves, CdR – Geneva Observatory, Raoul Behrend
 Discovery Circumstances: Numbered Minor Planets (1)-(5000) – Minor Planet Center
 
 

000850
Discoveries by Sergei Belyavsky
Named minor planets
19160327